Goodview Garden is an MTR Light Rail stop located at ground level between Hoi Chu Road and Hang Fu Street, south of Goodview Garden and east of Oceania Heights in Tuen Mun District. It began service on 17 November 1991 and belongs to Zone 1. It serves Goodview Garden, Oceania Heights and nearby areas.

MTR Light Rail stops
Former Kowloon–Canton Railway stations
Tuen Mun District
Railway stations in Hong Kong opened in 1991
1991 establishments in Hong Kong
MTR Light Rail stops named from housing estates